Fleur De Lys RFC is a Welsh rugby union club based in south-east Wales and are a feeder club for Newport Gwent Dragons. The 1st XV Team currently play in Division 4 East

History

Fleur De Lys RFC reformed into their current guise in 1966. In 1992 they obtained full membership of the 
Welsh Rugby Union.

The club since 1992 has had some notable success, with the senior team gaining successive promotions in 2002, 2003 and 2004. They attainted their highest league position in the 2006/07 season finishing 5th in Division One East. They beat some high-profile teams along the way including Pontypool. They were relegated the following season after finishing 11th, and again in the following season from Division 2 East.

'Flower' as they are known in rugby circles, bounced back to winning ways in the 2009/10 season and were promoted to Division Two East finishing as Champions of Division 3 East.

After three seasons in Division 2 East, the club were moved into the newly restructured Division One East for the forthcoming 2014/15 season.

Club Captain for the 2019/2020 season is Sam Williams.

The club also runs a Youth XV which competes in the Dragons C league.

Sporting honours
 WRU Division Four East 2000/2001 — Runner Up
 WRU Division Four East 2001/2002 — 3rd Promoted
 WRU Division Three East 2002/2003 — 4th Promoted
 WRU Division Two East 2003/2004 — Runner Up Promoted
 WRU Division One 2004/2005 - 9th
 WRU Division One 2005/2006 - 11th (no relegation)
 WRU Division One East 2006/2007 - 5th
 WRU Division Three East 2009/2010—Champions

References 

Rugby clubs established in 1966
Welsh rugby union teams